The Model and the Star is a 1939  Argentine comedy film directed by Manuel Romero. The film premiered on March 15, 1939 in Buenos Aires and starred Alita Román.

Cast
Alita Román ...  Gloria
Fernando Borel ...  Jorge
June Marlowe ...  Barbara
Marcelo Ruggero ...  Nicola
Juan Mangiante ...  Verdier
Alberto Terrones ...  Fiorini
Jacqueline Taubert ...  Georgette
Juan Porta ...  Boss
Carlos Bertoldi

External links

1939 films
1930s Spanish-language films
Argentine black-and-white films
1939 comedy films
Films directed by Manuel Romero
Argentine comedy films
1930s Argentine films